This is a list of Halls and Walks of Fame that have inducted Elvis Presley as a member.

 Rock and Roll Hall of Fame
 Country Music Hall of Fame
 Rockabilly Hall of Fame
 Gospel Hall of Fame
 Honky Tonk Hall of Fame
 Memphis Music Hall of Fame
 Mississippi Musicians Hall of Fame
 Mississippi Walk of Fame
 Shreveport's Walk of Stars 
 Mississippi Hall of Fame 
 Mississippi Arts and Entertainment Experience Hall of Fame
 Rhythm & Blues Music Hall of Fame
 UK Music Hall of Fame
 Playboy Jazz and Pop Hall of Fame
 Hit Parade Hall of Fame
 Christian Music Hall of Fame
 411 Music Hall of Fame
 Memorable Music Hall of Fame
 Kenpo Karate Hall of Fame
 Martial Arts Hall of Fame
 America's Pop Music Hall of Fame
 Hollywood Walk of Fame
 Las Vegas Walk of Stars

References 

Elvis Presley